Waterways are navigable bodies of water.

Waterways or variant, may also refer to:

Places
 Waterways, Victoria, a suburb of Melbourne, Australia
 Waterways, Alberta, a locality within the Regional Municipality of Wood Buffalo, Alberta, Canada
 Waterways, Oxford, a housing estate in North Oxford, England, UK

Art, entertainment, and media
 Waterways: Poetry in the Mainstream, a literary magazine and New York City arts in education program
 The Waterways Journal Weekly, a news journal for the towing and barge industry
 Waterways (TV series), an Irish documentary programme on RTÉ One

Other uses 
 The Waterways Trust, a UK independent national charity
 Waterways Experiment Station, a research facility in Vicksburg, Mississippi, US
 Waterways Visitor Centre, a facility near Grand Canal Dock, Dublin, Ireland

See also

 watercourse
 
 
 
 
 The Way of Water
 Way of Water